N.B. (released as Pocketful of Sunshine in North America) is the second studio album released by British singer Natasha Bedingfield. It was released in the United Kingdom on 30 April 2007 through Phonogenic Records. In the United Kingdom it produced two top ten hits, "I Wanna Have Your Babies" and "Soulmate". In January 2008, the album was released in the United States and Canada under the name Pocketful of Sunshine with new packaging and an alternative track listing featuring only six of the original songs. The US version's title song became a top-five hit whilst the lead single, "Love Like This" with Sean Kingston, became a top-fifteen hit. US critics said that the album felt inorganic and awkwardly assembled.

Music and lyrics
"How Do You Do?", the opening track about flirting, features guitars and a horn section. "I Wanna Have Your Babies", the second track, was chosen as the lead single as it was a representation Bedingfield's shifting priorities from being a single young woman to "dating, searching for a partner" and "looking for Mr Right". The song discusses a woman's battle to stop herself from rushing into relationships in an effort to find the right man to be the father of her children. The song received mixed reviews from music critics, who generally found it to be less impressive than past releases, but its release was moderately successful, reaching the top forty in most countries. The second single, "Soulmate", is a ballad on which Bedingfield wonders if there is a partner for everyone.

"Who Knows", the fourth track, begins with a "reggae-pop vibe" which slowly progresses to an electro-style sound featuring a string section. It received positive reviews, with one reviewer stating that it was reminiscent of "Amy Winehouse's gruff vocal style and her sassiness". "Who Knows" was also featured in the motion picture 27 Dresses. The fifth track and third single is "Say It Again". It is co-written with Mike Elizondo and Maroon 5's lead singer Adam Levine, who also provides backing vocals on the song. "Pirate Bones" discusses the pitfalls of celebrity and fame. On the song Bedingfield commented "if you're giving up your enjoyment of life for somebody else's idea of success, it's like being a pirate who's got his hoard of treasure and is sitting on an island where there are no shops to spend it. It doesn't mean anything."

The eighth track, "Angel", was inspired by R&B music and was composed around a series of piano loops. "When You Know You Know" features an orchestra and its lyrics discuss a failing relationship. The tenth track, "(No More) What Ifs", features a rap by Eve and received negative reviews, with The Guardian describing it as "an ill-advised move for all concerned". "Not Givin' Up", features a heavy urban beat with electronic sound effects in the background. The song was well received by critics because of its "near-certain crossover appeal for both sides of the Atlantic". "Still Here", the twelfth track, was originally recorded for the film Rocky Balboa in 2006, but was not included on the soundtrack. The song was later covered by Jennifer Hudson and included on her 2010 second album, I Remember Me.

Critical reception 

N.B. received mixed to positive reviews from most music critics, but some criticised it for its lightweight content. In a review for The Guardian, Craig McLean wrote that the album has "nothing as catchy as Unwritten, the tunes are on the airy-fairy side of breezy, and the lyrics on the naff side of plain". The Times called the album "patchy and disappointing" and gave it two out of five stars, whilst Marie Claire magazine said that "many of the tracks are forgettable", but that Bedingfield's "strong voice and eccentricities elevate her above many blonde and bland popstars." The album was called "good clean fun, entertaining and inoffensive" by Yahoo!, but was also noted for its lack of risk taking and Bedingfield's decision to continue her "grown-up cartoon pop" rather than try something new and that there was little chance of it being considered a classic album. However, Entertainment.ie reviewer Sheena McGinley was less impressed, and wrote that it was "too embarrassing to listen to in public", rating the album two out of five stars.

Pocketful of Sunshine received generally positive reviews from music critics. At Metacritic, which assigns a normalised rating out of 100 to reviews from mainstream critics, the album received an average score of 65, which indicates "generally favorable reviews", based on 14 reviews. Kerri Mason, Billboard reviewer, gave the album positive response. Mason wrote,"The album has an undeniable flip-flop feel throughout; like the unplugged soul-chick hoedown Beyoncé tried to conjure at the end of the "Irreplaceable" video." Christian Hoard of Rolling Stone wrote that "Bedingfield doesn't have much to say", but commented that "the packaging in which she wraps her openhearted thoughts makes Sunshine a decent little pop record". Bill Lamb of About.com noted that "unfortunately, her second solo album, massively reworked from her corresponding second album in the UK, is simply another professional, corporately polished pop record. Songs and vocals are reasonably solid..." but, he added, "it's hard to hear inspiration." Los Angeles Times was disappointed that "I Wanna Have Your Babies" was not included on Pocketful of Sunshine and wrote that "as awkward as the song is, it fleshes out Bedingfield's vision better than Jerkins' Mary J. Blige "Angel" or Rotem's Fergalicious "Piece of Your Heart". The album ending up receiving 2.5 stars out of 4. Allmusic gave the album a mixed review and described it as "awkwardly assembled", and added that it "feels inorganic in a way that Unwritten did not, less personal and more vetted by various A&R executives". Glenn Gambo in a review for Newsday gave the album C+ rating, and wrote that the album "barely registers" and was "full of pale copies of other successful pop [songs] that don't necessarily work for Bedingfield".

Commercial performance
N.B. debuted on the UK Albums Chart at number nine on 6 May 2007, selling 19,500 copies in its first week This would be the album's highest chart position and the only week it spent within the Top 20. The album spent a total of 13 weeks in the UK Top 100. Outside of the United Kingdom, the album failed to reach the top ten. In Ireland, N.B. debuted at number fourteen and in the Netherlands it reached number thirteen. It peaked outside the top twenty in Switzerland. In Australia, the album failed to enter the top one hundred, but peaked at number eleven on the Hitseekers albums chart.

Pocketful of Sunshine debuted on the Billboard 200 albums chart in the United States at number three, selling 50,000 copies. The first-week sales surpassed her debut album, Unwritten, which sold 34,000 copies its first week of release. The album has become the third highest debut by a United Kingdom-signed female artist in Billboard history, after Joss Stone, who entered at number two and now Leona Lewis, after her debut at number one. The album, however, quickly fell down the chart. After performing on American Idol, sales of the album and single "Pocketful of Sunshine" increased considerably. The album jumped from number 97 to number 24 on the Billboard 200, while the single charted within the top five on the Billboard charts. The album was certified Gold on 12 December 2008. To date it has sold more than 750,000 copies. In Canada, the album debuted at number thirteen.

Singles
"I Wanna Have Your Babies" was released as the lead single from N.B. on 2 April 2007. The single received mixed reviews but reached number seven on the UK Singles Chart and reached the top forty in most countries worldwide. "Soulmate" was released as the second single from the album on 2 July 2007. The single reached number seven on the UK Singles Chart and the top twenty in most countries worldwide, becoming even more successful than the album's lead single. "Love Like This", featuring Sean Kingston, was released on 25 September 2007. It was released for online music stores on 2 October 2007. The single was a top twenty hit in the United States, reaching number eleven on the Billboard Hot 100 and number ten on the Pop 100. The single was released in the United Kingdom on 7 April 2008. "Pocketful of Sunshine" was released on 11 February 2008. The single reached number five on the Billboard Hot 100, becoming Bedingfield's second top ten single. It also peaked at number three on the Canadian Hot 100. The song was selected as the theme song of Nickland in Germany.

"Angel" was released on 11 August 2008. In its first official week at radio, "Angel" started at number fifty-nine on Mediabase's Top 40 chart with 318 spins and jumped to number forty in its second week. Phil Griffin was booked to direct the music video. It reached number sixty-three on the US Billboard Hot 100, number thirty-five on the US Pop 100, number one on the US Hot Dance Club Play and number forty-one on the Canadian Hot 100. "Soulmate" was released in North America on 9 December 2008. Bedingfield performed the song in a medley at the American Music Awards of 2008 and on Dancing with the Stars. On 25 November 2008 Bedingfield confirmed "Soulmate" to be the fourth single while introducing the song at her Sophie's Lounge performance on Sophie @ 103.7. It only reached number ninety-six on the US Billboard Hot 100, however.

Promotional singles
"Say It Again", was released as promotional single from the album on 7 October 2007. The single completely failed to chart.

Track listing

Pocketful of Sunshine 

Notes
 – signifies a vocal producer.
 – signifies a remixer.

Personnel

N.B.
Adapted from the AllMusic credits.

Natasha Bedingfield – lead vocals, vocal producer, vocal arrangement
Adam Levine – backing vocals
Nikola Bedingfield – backing vocals
Danielle Brisebois – backing vocals
Jessica Collins – backing vocals
M. Hauge – producer 
Charles Judge – keyboards
Mike Krompass – drum engineering 
Adam MacDougall – keyboards
Jonas Myrin – keyboards
Nick Lashley – guitar
Vanessa Freebirn – cello, string arrangements 
Ryan Freeland – engineer
Adam Hawkins – engineer, mixing
Wayne Rodrigues – digital editing, drum programming, editing, engineer, keyboards, producer, turntables, vocal arrangement 
Brian Scheuble – engineer
Marcella "Ms. Lago" Araica – mixing 
Greg Kurstin – instrumentation, mixing, producer
Mark "Spike" Stent – mixing
John Akehurst – photography – mixing
Joanne Morris – art direction – mixing
W. Amar the Wizard Wilkins – drum programming, keyboard programming, keyboards, mixing, producer, programming

Pocketful of Sunshine
Adapted from the  Pocketful of Sunshine AllMusic credits.

Natasha Bedingfield – background vocals, vocals, audio producer
Louis Biancaniello – audio producer, producer  
Danielle Brisebois – backing vocals
Ravaughn Brown – backing vocals
Dernst Emile II – various instruments 
Steve Kipner – backing vocals, audio producer, producer
Richard Love – backing vocals
Meleni Smith – backing vocals
Mike Elizondo – audio producer, guitar, bass guitar, bass, programming, keyboards
Andrew Frampton – backing vocals, keyboards, programming
Richard Altenbach – orchestra conductor, arranger, strings
Toby Gad – arranger, audio producer, instrumentation, mixing, producer, programming, various instruments 
Mads Hauge – audio producer, guitars, vocal producer 
Rodney Jerkins – audio producer, various instruments
J. R. Rotem – instrumentation, arranger
Greg Kurstin – instrumentation, engineering
Jack Rothschild – drums, programming, engineering
John Shanks – guitar, bass guitar, keyboards, backing vocals
Wayne Wilkins – keyboards, backing vocals, drum programming, keyboard programming
Robbie Campesinos – vocal arrangements, backing vocals, guitar arrangements
Trevor Lawrence – drums, cymbals
Charles Judge – keyboards
Nick Lashley, Wendy Melvoin – guitar
Michael Valerio, Kate Bird – bass guitar
Julie Gigante – violin
 Neel Hammond – violin
Natalie Leggett – violin
Mark Robertson – violin
Keith Greene – viola
Victor Lawrence – cello
 Sebastian Toettcher – cello
Jason Pennock – digital editing
Greg Ogan – engineering, vocal engineering
Lleyton Blaine – assistant engineer, mixing assistant
Adam Hawkins, Brian Scheuble – engineering
Daniel Frampton – vocal engineering
Keith Gretlein – assistant engineer
Anne Kasdorf – assistant engineer
Matt Serrecchio – assistant engineer
Marcella "Ms. Lago" Araica – mixing
Manny Marroquin – mixing
Phil Tan – mixing
Alex Dromgoole – mixing assistant
Josh Houghkirk – mixing assistant
Matt Paul – mixing assistant
David Kutch – mastering
John Akehurst – photography
Michelle Holme – design

Charts

Weekly charts

Year-end charts

Certifications

Release history

References

2007 albums
2008 albums
Albums produced by Danja (record producer)
Albums produced by Greg Kurstin
Albums produced by J. R. Rotem
Albums produced by John Shanks
Albums produced by Patrick Leonard
Albums produced by Rodney Jerkins
Albums produced by Ryan Tedder
Albums produced by Toby Gad
Albums produced by Tom Rothrock
Natasha Bedingfield albums

fr:Pocketful of Sunshine
it:Pocketful of Sunshine
pl:Pocketful of Sunshine (album)
pt:Pocketful of Sunshine
tr:Pocketful of Sunshine